Alice Carroll may refer to:

A character in the manga Aria
A character in the video game Rage of the Dragons